is a Japanese novelist and television producer. He is known for his right-wing political views and denying Japanese war crimes prior to and during World War II. He is particularly known for his 2006 novel The Eternal Zero, which became a popular 2013 film, his controversial period as a governor of government broadcaster NHK, as well as his support of Nanjing Massacre denial.

Hyakuta has written a number of other books, several of which have been turned into films, such as Bokkusu and Monsuta.

The Eternal Zero
In 2006 Hyakuta's novel The Eternal Zero was published. It became a best-seller, with four million copies sold. It was made into a popular 2013 movie. The novel was criticised by famed Studio Ghibli director Hayao Miyazaki as being "a pack of lies" about the war, leading to Hyakuta speculating that Miyazaki "wasn't right in the head".

As NHK governor
In 2013, Hyakuta was selected by Shinzō Abe as one of 12 members of the board of governors of Japan's national broadcaster, NHK. This came after the re-election of the Liberal Democratic Party led by Abe. Hyakuta had supported in his bid to re-assume leadership of the LDP the previous year. The selection of Hyakuta as an NHK governor caused some criticism, but the diet approved Hyakuta's appointment in November 2013. His historical views denying the Nanjing Massacre sparked extended controversy after his speech in support of Toshio Tamogami's bid for the Tokyo governorship in 2014 bought renewed attention to his rightist views. He resigned as a governor in 2015.

Historical views

During a speech on March 3, 2014, in support of Toshio Tamogami's bid for the governorship of Tokyo, Hyakuta stated that the Nanjing Massacre "never happened", and stated that the Tokyo War Crimes Trials were a "sham" to cover up US war crimes such as firebombing and the atomic bombings of Hiroshima and Nagasaki. He also stated that he didn't see a need to teach such things to children, as they should be taught what a great country Japan is. He said that claims about the Nanjing Massacre were brought up at the Tokyo War Crimes Tribunals only to cancel out the crimes the US had committed. A press officer at the US embassy in Tokyo described Hyakuta's views as "preposterous".

In 2014 as an NHK governor he claimed that it was wrong to state that ethnic Koreans were forcibly brought to Japan during the Japanese colonial period.

Defamation suits
Hyakuta wrote a book called Jun'ai (2014) in memory of his recently deceased friend, the radio and TV show host Yashiki Takajin. The book, written as if it were a work of reporting, portrayed Takajin's daughter and his manager as callous, cruel individuals who abandoned him in his final days. Takajin's manager and daughter both sued for slander. Hyakuta claimed that although all the persons named were real, the book was a "fiction." He had relied heavily on uncritical interviews with Takajin's widow, and did not mention her bigamy in the text of the book, only admitting to it later.  After multiple appeals, in December 2017 the Supreme Court of Japan found that Hyakuta had slandered Takajin's daughter and ordered 3.65 million yen paid in compensation. In November 2018 the Tokyo District Court found that Hyakuta had slandered Takajin's manager as well, ordering an additional 2.75 million yen in compensation and a written apology.

Plagiarism
His latest book, Nihon Kokuki, a history of Japan published in 2018, was discovered to contain fictitious statements as well as plagiarism from sources such as Wikipedia articles, the latter being admitted by the author himself.

See also
Nanjing Massacre denial
The Eternal Zero

References

External links

20th-century Japanese novelists
21st-century Japanese novelists
People from Osaka
People involved in plagiarism controversies
1956 births
Living people
Conservatism in Japan
Nanjing Massacre deniers
Anti-Korean sentiment in Japan
Japanese activists
Japanese nationalists
Historical negationism